The Oberaarhorn is a mountain of the Bernese Alps, located on the border between the Swiss cantons of Valais and Bern. Its summit (3,629 metres) is the tripoint between the basins of the Fiesch (Valais), Unteraar and Oberaar Glacier (Bern).

References

External links
Oberaarhorn on Summitpost
Oberaarhorn on Hikr

Mountains of the Alps
Alpine three-thousanders
Mountains of Switzerland
Mountains of the canton of Bern
Mountains of Valais
Bern–Valais border